Channel Islands Practical Shooting Association (CIPSA) is the Channel Islands region for practical shooting under the International Practical Shooting Confederation.

External links 
 Official Facebook-page of Channel Islands Practical Shooting Association

References 

Regions of the International Practical Shooting Confederation
Sports organisations of the Channel Islands